The 1995 Welsh local elections,  were held on 4 May in the 22 new local authorities, as part of the wider 1995 UK local elections.

Wales-Wide Results

Result

In all 22 Welsh councils the whole of the council was up for election.

†Council was renamed shortly after election.

Notes

References

External links

 
1995 elections in the United Kingdom
1995 United Kingdom local elections
1995
May 1995 events in the United Kingdom